Phalonidia electra is a species of moth of the family Tortricidae. It is found in Carchi Province, Ecuador.

The wingspan is about 16.5 mm. The ground colour of the forewings is glossy white with a creamy-yellowish hue. The costal spots are golden ochreous and the remaining markings somewhat browner. The hindwings are creamy white, tinged with light ochreous apically.

References

Moths described in 2002
Phalonidia